Rugby union in Paraguay is a secondary sport. With 4,355 registered players and twenty clubs, the country currently ranks 37th worldwide and 4th in South America.

The Paraguayan Rugby Union (Union de Rugby del Paraguay) was founded in 1970, and joined the IRB in 1989.

History

The first recorded game of rugby in the country was in the 1930s, between players from Cerro Porteño and Olimpia (the country's two biggest football clubs). Further development of the game was sporadic.

Asuncion Rugby Club, the country's first official rugby club, was formed in the late 1960s by two Britons, two Argentines, a Dutchman, and a New Zealander. They played informal games in the Jardin Botanico (Botanic Gardens of Asuncion) and travelled to Argentina for games.

In 1970 a second club was set up in Asuncion, the Club Universitario de Asunción (CURDA). Further clubs were established in the 1970s and 1980s.

The sport's governing body, the Paraguayan Rugby Union (Union de Rugby del Paraguay), was founded in 1970 and joined the IRFB in 1989.

The traditional stronghold of Paraguayan rugby has been the capital, Asuncion, where the majority of clubs have been based. However Since 2000 a number of Asuncion clubs have folded, combined, or struggled to field teams in both Primera (First Grade of the Paraguayan Rugby Union Championship) and Intermedia (reserve grade).

In 2013 the teams in Primera were all from Asuncion: CURDA, San Jose, Old King Club, Luque, Cristo Rey, Universidad Autonoma de Asuncion, and Santa Clara.

Las Leones de Encarnacion, from the south of the country, competed in Primera until 2009 when they switched to compete in the URNE championship of Northern Argentina. Encarnacion is a riverside city opposite the Argentine city of Posadas. Las Leones often fielded a strong team in Primera, but they are closer to the Posadas, Corrientes and Resistencia, than to Asuncion (a 5-hour bus trip). While strong at home they often struggled to field a competitive team when traveling to Asuncion every second week for Primera. They have since won the URNE championship.

Since 2010 there has been strong growth in both women's rugby and rugby outside of and in the outskirts of Asuncion. Traditionally teams such as Ciudad del Este and Coronel Oviedo played only occasionally, or fielded a team in Intermedia or Primera where they often struggled. In 2010 a separate "Campeonato del Interior" was established, in which developing clubs from the countryside played. Teams include Santani, Coronel Oviedo, Villarica, Ciudad del Este and Presidente Franco.

All Primera teams are now obliged to field a women's team. The women play 7-a-side rugby with mini 7 a side championships held every couple of weeks.

From 2013 a separate Campeonato Metropolitano (Metropolitan Championship) was also established, for new developing teams from Asuncion which could not yet compete in Primera. Teams include San Lorenzo, Capiata, Asuncion, and Sajonia.

Divisions
Traditionally Paraguayan rugby clubs have fielded teams in Primera and/or Intermedia.
In recent years a Campeonato del Interior (Countryside Club Championship) and Campeonato Metropolitano (Metropolitan Championship) have been formed for developing clubs and clubs in rural areas.

Primera Teams also usually field Under 18, Under 16, Under 14 and Junior teams, and, as of recently, women's rugby teams.

Paraguayan Rugby Clubs 
 Primera Division 2022 (First Division)

 Intermedia 2022 (2nd Division)

 Campeonato del Interior (Countryside Championship)

 Campeonato Metropolitano (Metropolitan Championship)

 Encarnación Rugby Club "Las Leones de Encarnación" compete in the URNE rugby Championship which is part of the Argentine Rugby Union.

There are several former clubs which no longer exist, such as Los Cuervos, Jabalí and Yakaré.

Senior Paraguayan Rugby Championship

Women's rugby
As mentioned above, women's rugby in Paraguay involves the teams from Primera fielding Seven-a-side teams. To play in Primera teams are obliged to field a women's team, which has spurred on the development of the sport for women.

The teams involved are CURDA, San Jose, Cristo Rey, Santa Clara, Universidad Autonoma de Asuncion, Old King Club, and Luque.

Old King Club has dominated women's rugby in Paraguay, winning every women's championship and providing the bulk of the Paraguayan Women's Seven-a-side team. Both Old King Club and the National Women's Team are coached by Victor Velilla.
  
Although Paraguay's women have not yet played a full 15 a sive test match, they have been playing international sevens rugby since 2004. In 2013 they came 8th and last in the CONSUR South American Women's Sevens Championship.

Paraguayans Playing Abroad
Several Paraguayans have played overseas.

In France, Cesar Meilike, Jatar Fernandez, Fabio Franco and Emiliano Arnau played for Strasbourg, and José Otaño and Joel Orihuela for US CENAC, at Fédérale 2, and Freddy Lares and Miguel Jara for Houilles Carrilies at Fédérale 3.

In Germany several Paraguayans have played in Bundesliga 1 including Juan Caba Cabañas, Fabio Franco, Willians Portillo  and Oscar Merino.

In Spain Willians Portillo  (Madrid), Javier Morinigo (San Cugat – Barcelona, ex-Albertong de Sudafrica), Igor Huerta (Universidad de Málaga), Jorge Ocampo (CEU Rugby Barcelona) and Emiliano Arnau (Rugby Lavila) have played.

Diego Sotelo and Gonzalo Sanches played College Rugby Division 1 in the United States.

Alex Sharman is an Australian-born naturalized Paraguayan who played for Paraguay and the University of Sydney (NSW, Australia), Falkirk (Scotland), Hinckley and Clifton Rugby Clubs (England), St. Louis Ramblers (USA) and Rugby La Vila (Spain).

For several reasons these overseas players often aren't available to play for Paraguay, but in 2009 Joel Orihuela and Juan Cabanas returned to South America for the South American Championships in Montevideo, and in 2010 Jose Otano, Diego Sotelo played for Paraguay in the South American Championship in Santiago de Chile.

See also
 Paraguay national rugby union team

External links
 IRB Paraguay page
 official union page
 Archives du Rugby: Paraguay

References
 Bath, Richard (ed.) The Complete Book of Rugby (Seven Oaks Ltd, 1997 )
 Thau, Chris The South American Scene in Starmer-Smith, Nigel & Robertson, Ian (eds) The Whitbread Rugby World '89 (Lennard Books, 1988 )

 
Sport in Paraguay